Podvis is a village in Sungurlare Municipality, in Burgas Province, in southeastern Bulgaria.

Podvis Col on Davis Coast in Antarctica is named after the village.

References

Villages in Burgas Province